Eremastrella is a genus of lichen in the family Lecideaceae. The genus was circumscribed by lichenologist Stefan Vogel  in 1955, with Eremastrella tobleri assigned as the type species.

Species
Eremastrella montana  – South Africa
Eremastrella tobleri 

The species once named Eremastrella crystallifera  is now known as Psora crystallifera.

References

Lecideales
Lichen genera
Lecideales genera
Taxa described in 1955